Richard Underhill Scott (November 24, 1924 – August 20, 2012) was an American football player for the Navy Midshipmen. Scott was selected twice to the first team All-American team. He was selected first team All-America in 1945, second team in 1946, then selected again to first team in 1947. He was elected to the College Football Hall of Fame in 1987. He also earned varsity letters in basketball and lacrosse at the U.S. Naval Academy.

Scott graduated from Highland Falls (NY) High School in 1942.

References

Sources
Oldest Living College Football HOF Players - Dick Scott
Obituary – Richard Underhill Scott

1924 births
2012 deaths
Navy Midshipmen football players
College Football Hall of Fame inductees